Alula Airport  is an airport serving Aluula (Alula, Caluula), a Gulf of Aden coastal village in the Bari region of northeastern Somalia.

See also
Transport in Somalia
List of airports in Somalia

References

External links
OpenStreetMap - Alula Airport
OurAirports - Alula

Airports in Somalia
Puntland